The Cyclo-cross Kalmthout is a cyclo-cross race held in Kalmthout, Belgium. First held in 1991 under the name "Grote prijs industrie Bosduin", this race was a part of the UCI Cyclo-cross World Cup in 1999, 2002 and 2005 till 2010. In the 2011-2012 season, it was replaced by Namen.

Past winners

References

External links
 

UCI Cyclo-cross World Cup
Cycle races in Belgium
Cyclo-cross races
Recurring sporting events established in 1991
1991 establishments in Belgium
Sport in Antwerp Province
Kalmthout